Vishni is a village in Municipality of Struga, North Macedonia.

Population
As of the 2021 census, Višni had 705 residents with the following ethnic composition:
Macedonians 46
Others 1

2002 Population: 14
 Macedonians 14

References

Villages in Struga Municipality